Oleg Vasilyevich Shinkaryov (born 28 February 1965) is a Russian professional football official and a former player.

External links
 

1965 births
Living people
Soviet footballers
Russian footballers
Association football defenders
FC Shakhtar Stakhanov players
FC Kuban Krasnodar players
FC Chernomorets Novorossiysk players
FK Köpetdag Aşgabat players
FC SKA Rostov-on-Don players
FC Lokomotiv Moscow players
FC Zorya Luhansk players
FC Zhemchuzhina Sochi players
FC Slavyansk Slavyansk-na-Kubani players
Soviet Top League players
Russian Premier League players